The 1967 British Grand Prix was a Formula One motor race held at Silverstone on 15 July 1967. It was race 6 of 11 in both the 1967 World Championship of Drivers and the 1967 International Cup for Formula One Manufacturers. The 80-lap race was won by Lotus driver Jim Clark after he started from pole position. Denny Hulme finished second for the Brabham team and Ferrari driver Chris Amon came in third.

Classification

Qualifying

Race

Championship standings after the race

Drivers' Championship standings

Constructors' Championship standings

 Notes: Only the top five positions are included for both sets of standings.

References

British Grand Prix
British Grand Prix
Grand Prix
British Grand Prix